Project M-13 is the fourth and final studio album by Milk Cult, released on March 7, 2000, by 0 To 1 Recordings.

Track listing

Personnel
Adapted from the Project M-13 liner notes.

Milk Cult
 Dale Flattum (as C.C. Nova) – bass guitar, loops
 Eric Holland (as Conko) – electronics
 Mike Morasky (as The Bumblebee) – sampler, electronics

Release history

References

External links 
 Project M-13 at Discogs (list of releases)

2000 albums
Milk Cult albums